Sarnya Marie Parker, OAM (born 6 June 1975) is an Australian visually impaired paralympic tandem cyclist. She was born in the South Australian town of Loxton. Before she took up Paralympic tandem cycling, she was a nationally ranked top-ten pentathlete. She won a gold medal in long jump at the 1999 FESPIC Games in Thailand.

Eighteen months before the 2000 Sydney Games, visually impaired Paralympic tandem cyclist Kieran Modra convinced her to switch from athletics to cycling because of the limited opportunities in the former sport for Paralympians. He introduced her to his sister, Tania Modra, despite Modra's lack of competitive cycling experience, and she became Parker's pilot. She won two gold medals for Australia with Modra at the 2000 Sydney Games in the 1 km road race and 3000 m pursuit, for which she received a Medal of the Order of Australia; the pair broke the world record in both events. In 2000, she received an Australian Sports Medal. In 2009, a walking trail on the riverfront of Loxton was named after her.

References

1975 births
Living people
Recipients of the Medal of the Order of Australia
Recipients of the Australian Sports Medal
Sportswomen from South Australia
Cyclists from South Australia
Australian female cyclists
Paralympic cyclists of Australia
Cyclists at the 2000 Summer Paralympics
Medalists at the 2000 Summer Paralympics
Paralympic gold medalists for Australia
Paralympic cyclists with a vision impairment
Australian blind people
Paralympic medalists in cycling